Mandy is a 1952 British black and white film about a family's struggle to give their deaf daughter a better life. It was directed by Alexander Mackendrick and is based on the novel The Day Is Ours by Hilda Lewis. It stars Phyllis Calvert, Jack Hawkins and Terence Morgan, and features the first film appearance by Jane Asher. In the US the film was released as The Story of Mandy, and later was sold to television as Crash of Silence.

A high proportion of the film looks at educational methods for the deaf in the 1950s and is very instructional in this context. It also sees the world from the deaf child's eyes.

Plot
Christine Garland has a young deaf daughter, Mandy. Her husband Harry is away from home.

As they realise their daughter's situation, the parents enrol Mandy in special education classes to try to get her to speak. They quarrel in the process and their marriage comes under strain. There are also hints of a possible affair between Christine and Dick Searle, the headmaster of the school for the deaf where Mandy is enrolled. 
Mandy's first speech is achieved by using a balloon. She is able to feel the vibrations of sound onto the balloon and know she had made a sound.

Harry Garland returns to Christine and Mandy and wants Mandy taken out of the school and sent to a private school. Christine strongly resists.

Searle perseveres and eventually, the training succeeds to the point where Mandy says "Mama". Searle's boss Ackland is unhappy about the relationship between Searle and Christine and word of this reaches Searle. Word also reaches Harry Garland who is staying with his parents in a large London townhouse. Harry goes to speak to Ackland. Then he confronts Christine.

He takes Mandy out of the school and takes her to his parents' house. Mandy is sad. The back garden looks onto a bomb-site where children are playing. The children ask her to play and ask her name. With her parents behind she says "Mandy" for the first time.

Cast 

 Phyllis Calvert as Christine Garland
 Jack Hawkins as Dick Searle
 Terence Morgan as Harry Garland
 Godfrey Tearle as Mr Garland
 Mandy Miller as Mandy Garland
 Marjorie Fielding as Mrs Garland
 Nancy Price as Jane Ellis
 Edward Chapman as Ackland
 Patricia Plunkett as Miss Crocker
 Eleanor Summerfield as Lily Tabor
 Colin Gordon as Wollard (junior)
 Dorothy Alison as Miss Stockton
 Julian Amyes as Jimmy Tabor
 Gabrielle Brune as Secretary
 John Cazabon as Davey
 Gwen Bacon as Mrs Paul
 W. E. Holloway as Woollard (senior)
 Phyllis Morris as Miss Tucker
 Gabrielle Blunt as Miss Larner
 Jean Shepherd as Mrs Jackson
 Jane Asher (aged six) as Nina

Production
The film's screenplay was written by Nigel Balchin and Jack Whittingham. The film was shot at the Ealing Studios in west London, and also at the Royal Schools for the Deaf outside Manchester.

Reception

Box office
Mandy premiered in London on 29 July 1952, and was the fifth most popular at the British box office that year.

Awards
The film was nominated for  six BAFTA awards at the 1953 British Academy Film Awards ceremony, but didn't win any. Alexander Mackendrick was awarded the Special Jury Prize at the 1952 Venice Film Festival for his direction, and the film was nominated for the Golden Lion at the same festival.

See also

List of films featuring the deaf and hard of hearing

References

External links 
 
 
 
 
 

1952 films
1952 drama films
British drama films
British black-and-white films
Films about deaf people
Venice Grand Jury Prize winners
Ealing Studios films
Films directed by Alexander Mackendrick
Films produced by Michael Balcon
Films scored by William Alwyn
Films shot in London
Films set in London
Films with screenplays by Jack Whittingham
Films with screenplays by Nigel Balchin
Films shot in Greater Manchester
1950s English-language films
1950s British films